The second season of the animated television series Rick and Morty originally aired on Cartoon Network's late night programming block Adult Swim in the United States on July 26, 2015 with "A Rickle in Time", and concluded on October 4 with "The Wedding Squanchers". This season aired a total of ten episodes.

Cast and characters

The actors and actresses listed below lend their voices to the corresponding animated characters.

Main cast

 Justin Roiland as Rick Sanchez and Morty Smith, the two main characters of the show; Rick is an eccentric mad scientist and Morty is his kind but easily distressed grandson.
 Chris Parnell as Jerry Smith, Rick's son-in-law and Morty's father; a simple-minded and insecure person, who disapproves of Rick's influence over his family.
 Spencer Grammer as Summer Smith, Rick's granddaughter and Morty's sister; a conventional teenager who worries about improving her status among her peers.
 Sarah Chalke as Beth Smith, Rick's daughter and Morty's mother; a generally level-headed person, who is dissatisfied with her marriage.

Guest cast

Other cast members
Other cast members of the season, who each have voiced one or more characters, include: Jay Johnson, Tom Kenny, Jill Talley, Paul F. Tompkins, Scott Chernoff, Ryan Elder, Will Jennings, Maurice LaMarche, Tress MacNeille, Ryan Ridley, Kari Wahlgren, John Kassir, Dawnn Lewis, Nolan North, Rob Paulsen, Gary Anthony Williams, Tony Barbieri, Kevin Michael Richardson, Jevin Smith, Tara Strong, Dan Benson, Dan Harmon, Jess Harnell, Phil Hendrie, William Holmes, Cassie Steele, Mike McCaffery, Brandon Johnson, James Atkinson, Rob Schrab and Arin Hanson.

Episodes

Production
In January 2014, the series was renewed for a second season that began on July 26, 2015.

Wes Archer, Dominic Polcino, Bryan Newton and Juan Meza-León served as directors, while series co-creators Justin Roiland and Dan Harmon, Matt Roller, David Phillips, Ryan Ridley, Mike McMahan, Tom Kauffman, Dan Guterman and Alex Rubens served as writers. All episodes in the second season originally aired in the United States on Adult Swim. All episodes are rated TV-14, with the exception of "Interdimensional Cable 2: Tempting Fate", which was rated TV-MA-L.

Reception
The second season has an approval rating of 91% on Rotten Tomatoes based on 13 reviews, with an average rating of 7.81 out of 10. The site's critics consensus reads: "Rick and Morty gains even more slimy layers of complexity throughout its sophomore season, with the dysfunctional duo knocking heads and diametrically opposed philosophies during a string of intricately hilarious misadventures."

Annie Howard of the Chicago Reader wrote: "The show's hyperactive, off-the-cuff energy is a special treat, even in an increasingly crowded animated-comedy field where other great shows like Bojack Horseman and Bob's Burgers  compete for eyeballs."

Home media
The second season was released on DVD (Region 1) and Blu-ray on June 7, 2016.

Notes

References

External links 

Rick and Morty
Rick and Morty seasons